Hui mian is a Henan-style noodle soup. It is made with lamb bones cooked with various Chinese herbs, such as lycium chinese and star anise, for at least five hours to get a distinct milky white broth. In addition to noodles, the soup can contain kelp shreds, tofu shreds, coriander, quail eggs, and may be garnished with coriander, chili oil, sugar, garlic, and minced peppers.

The ingredients used in Hui mian differ in regards to different cities and restaurants.

History 
The hui mian recipe is widespread and originated in the Tang dynasty. The origin of the dish is said to be that a rural woman invented hui mian when she tried to make a type of nutritious soup for Li Shimin, the second emperor, to help him recover his strength when he was starving while on the run during a war. Li loved the dish, so Li found the lady a year later after he became the emperor of the Tang Dynasty. The emperor then commanded his royal chefs to study the recipe from that lady. 

Hui mian became a secret food in royal families. Centuries later, in the late Qing Dynasty, when the Eight-Nation Alliance invaded China, the Empress Dowager Ci Xi was recorded saying that she had hui mian a lot during the run of the war, and that "Hui mian can dispel cold". Until the end of the Qing Dynasty, the royal chef Pang Enfu escaped from the Forbidden City and lived in seclusion in Henan. He started teaching the common people to cook Hui mian, and as a result Hui mian began spreading among the common people.

Variations 
The province of Henan is famous for its hui mian. Most hui mian in the Henan area are culinary variants of the original royal food of hui mian. The province has more than a hundred million people, and as a result many different styles of hui mian have developed between populations and ethnic groups.

Yang Fu Yan hui mian 
Yang Fu Yan hui mian has become famous in recent years in Henan. The Yang Fu Yan recipe of hui mian follows the traditional cooking style of hui mian, using only mutton and beef as broth, instead of adding pork as other newly developed recipes do.

Heji Lamb Hui mian 

Heji Lamb hui mian is a Halal variant of hui mian. The predecessor of Heji style originated from the Old Folks Hotel and Restaurant in Zheng Zhou. In 1953, Li Shaoqing and four other people were in charge of the hotel management, so they changed the name to "Heji Restaurant"; "Heji" means "many people manage together" in Chinese. Since 1967, they have specialized in lamb noodles, and renamed their signature dish to "Heji (合记) Lamb hui mian", commonly known as "Heji". In May 1994, Heji Hui mian won the award of "all of the famous brand names of food" in China. In December 1997 it won the title of "Chinese famous snacks".

Xiaoji Sanxian Hui mian  

Xiao Ji Sanxian Hui mian is another common Hui mian style in Henan. Xiaoji Sanxian Hui mian's founder Xiao Honghe was a Yifu mian chef in the Zhengzhou government-owned Changchun Hotel. After retiring from the government-owned restaurant, he and his two sons opened a Hui mian restaurant. He did not follow the traditional mutton Hui mian recipe, but he found his special recipe from the inspiration of Yifu noodles by adding Sanxian ingredients to the original mutton or beef broth and mixing the traditional mutton broth with chicken broth and bone broth. Sanxian means using a combination of three umami dressing ingredients, which are commonly shrimp, black wood ear, and baby bamboos. Nowadays, people use a variation of these three dressing ingredients as long as the categories of seafood, fungus, and fresh vegetables can also be called Sanxian Hui mian.

Yexian Hui mian 
The main feature of Yexian Hui mian is the mutton hot pot, which is made of high-quality flour, which is delicate and smooth, soft and glutinous, smooth and palatable. The Hui mian soup is made of fresh lamb chops and lamb hooves, and a little more flavorful spice seasoning. Fat but not greasy, light but not thin, with scorched chili oil, beautiful in color and fragrance. It is well known in more than a dozen counties and cities in the surrounding area and belongs to the special flavor category.

Junxian Old-fashioned Hui mian 
Jun County is located in the northern part of Henan Province and is the main producing area of high-gluten wheat. As a result, the noodles of the people of Junxian County are more abundant and diverse. The old-fashioned noodles of Junxian County, the biggest difference from other noodles, is the secret stir-fried stewed noodles, the original soup noodles. It can be said that the Hebi people's gourmet memories.

Secret stir-fried stew: dry stir-fried lamb, stir-fried with black sauce. Take goat meat, dice, and set aside. Heat the oil, fry the scallion and ginger, stir-fry the lamb for about 30 minutes. Change the heat to low heat and stir-fry for 10 minutes with the secret black sauce. Handmade noodles, boiled noodles in clear broth, cooked with mustard, dried shrimps, secret stir-fried marinated bowl. Gluten, delicious and aromatic.

Fangcheng hui mian 

Fangcheng hui mian originated in the early 1980s. They were inspired by Zhengzhou hui mian. The stewed noodle masters combined the characteristics of Fangcheng-there are more Hui people, so they are rich in mutton resources. Then they explored and improved based on Zhengzhou braised noodles. Southern specialties-Fangcheng hui mian. Fangcheng hui mian seems easy to make, but to achieve true taste is by no means what ordinary people can do. To determine whether it is authentic Fangcheng hui mian, one looks at the soup, the second with the noodles, and the third with chili oil.

Lamb bones and whole lamb skeleton for soup, put them in a pot of clean water, and simmer on high heat. After two hours, they will foam up and put in the old seasoning bag to improve the flavor. Add the mutton pieces, then change to a new seasoning bag to add flavor, the fire is overwhelming, and then it is simmered. 

A few hours later, the house was full of mellow fragrance, the meat seemed to be rotten as mud, and the soup was as thick as milk. Choose the best wheat flour, water and noodles, salt and water, and salt is the key. Knead the dough into a ball into a floc. Knead, knead hard, the dough is bright and shiny, and the gluten is as strong as glue. Cover the pressure plate with a damp cloth. After sex, sit quietly, divide the noodles into one or two noodles each, push and roll them into oval noodles, apply a small layer of sesame oil on both sides to prevent adhesion, one by one, shiny and white, neatly stacked Into the disk, to spare it. This is the method of making noodles, with three-character commands: flexibility, toughness, and light. Chili oil, the finest seasoning of Fangcheng hui mian, is like using MSG for cooking. To make chili oil, mutton oil and small red-pointed chili produced in Fangcheng must be used.

Modern hui mian storage process 
Due to modern technology and increased demand, many university labs in Henan have developed instant storage of hui mian to keep the taste while making it easy for people to store, move it around, and eat it. The best way for preserving food for storage and easy consumption is "instant frozen".

See also 
 Chinese Islamic cuisine
 Chinese noodles
 Instant noodles
 List of Chinese soups
 List of noodle dishes
 Beef noodle soup
 Henan cuisine
 Luoyang
 Zhengzhou

References 

Chinese noodle dishes
Culture in Henan